"This Is Love" is a song by English musician Gary Numan, released in 1986 as the lead single from his eighth studio album Strange Charm. It was written by Numan, and produced by Numan and the Waveteam. "This Is Love" reached No. 28 in the UK and remained in the charts for three weeks.

A music video was filmed to promote the single. Early copies of the single included a free interview flexi disc, while some 12" copies were issued with "Call Out the Dogs" as a free single.

Critical reception
Upon release, Newcastle Evening Chronicle described the song as a "slow romantic ballad" and Numan's "best in ages". In a retrospective review of the album, Ned Raggett of AllMusic wrote: "Numan uses silence and less-crowded arrangements to create a more dramatic impact. Flat-out successes such as "The Sleeproom" and the concluding ballad "This Is Love," with heavily echoed piano and singing leading the way, show how his decision worked wonders." In 2007, Mojo described the song as a "classy track".

Track listing
7" single
"This Is Love" - 4:30
"Survival" - 5:02

12" single
"This Is Love" - 4:30
"Survival" - 5:02

12" single (UK edition with free single)
"This Is Love" - 4:30
"Survival" - 5:02
"Call Out the Dogs" - 6:42
"No Shelter" - 3:23
"This Ship Comes Apart" - 3:55

Personnel
 Gary Numan - vocals, keyboards
 Martin Elliott - bass guitar
 Dick Morrissey - saxophone
 Mike Smith - keyboards
 Tessa Niles - backing vocals

Production
 Gary Numan - producer
 The Waveteam - producers
 Tim Summerhayes - engineer
 Arun Chakraverty - mastering

Other
 Francis Drake - artwork

Charts

References

1986 songs
1986 singles
Gary Numan songs
Songs written by Gary Numan